Þorsteinn Víglundsson (born 22 November 1969) is an Icelandic politician who served as Member of Parliament for the Reform Party (Viðreisn) in the Althing. He served as Iceland's Minister of Social Affairs and Equality in 2017, and under his leadership, a bill of law (amendments to the Gender Equality Act No. 10/2008) was passed by the Icelandic Parliament (Althingi) with a vast majority on 1 June 2017 and came into force on 1 January 2018. Companies and institutions employing 25 or more workers, on an annual basis, are required to obtain equal pay certification of their equal pay systems and the implementation thereof. The purpose of this obligatory certification is to enforce the current legislation prohibiting discriminatory practices based on gender and requiring women and men working for the same employer to be paid equal wages and enjoy equal terms of employment for the same jobs or jobs of equal value.

Prior to entering politics, Þorsteinn served as executive director of SA - Business Iceland, a service organization for Icelandic businesses.

References 

1969 births
Living people
Thorsteinn Viglundsson
Thorsteinn Viglundsson